The 1995 Cheltenham Council election took place on 4 May 1995 to elect members of Cheltenham Borough Council in Gloucestershire, England. One third of the council was up for election and the Liberal Democrats stayed in overall control of the council. For the second year in a row, the Conservatives failed to win a single seat up for election.

After the election, the composition of the council was
Liberal Democrat 28
Conservative 8
People Against Bureaucracy 3
Labour 2

Election result

Ward results

References

Cheltenham
Cheltenham Borough Council elections